Anna Hvoslef (October 5, 1866 – 11 March 1954) was a Norwegian journalist, conservative politician and feminist. One of Norway's first female professional journalists, she was the first woman to work as a journalist at the major newspaper Aftenposten and served as president of the Norwegian Association for Women's Rights 1930–1935.

Biography
She was born at Larvik in  Vestfold, Norway. She was the daughter of Johan Christian Georg Hvoslef (1819-1889). Her father was an attorney who served as county governor of Lister og Mandals amt (now Aust-Agder).

She was one of the first Norwegian female journalists. She  was employed by the leading conservative daily Aftenposten from 1897 to 1935 as its first female journalist. As a journalist, she had a main focus on literature. She also published travel literature from her travels in Europe and the Americas. She was the first female member of the Association of the Conservative Press and was president of the Norwegian Association for Women's Rights from 1930 to 1935.

References

1866 births
1954 deaths
People from Larvik
Aftenposten people
19th-century Norwegian journalists
Norwegian women's rights activists
Norwegian feminists
Norwegian Association for Women's Rights people
20th-century Norwegian journalists
20th-century Norwegian politicians
20th-century Norwegian writers
20th-century Norwegian women politicians
20th-century Norwegian women writers
19th-century women journalists